Geoffrey Spink Bagley (3 November 1901 – 1992) was an English artist, museum curator, politician, historian and writer.

In 1942 the Wartime Information Board and the National Film Board of Canada hired Bagley as a graphic artist. He created wartime propaganda and recruitment posters for the Royal Navy.

Selected works
 The Ancient Town of Rye (1958)
 Some Inns & Ale-houses of Rye, 1650-1950 (1958)
 William Holloway, Historian of Rye: a Study of His Life and Times, 1785-1870 (1963)
 Old inns & Ale-houses of Rye (1965)
 The Ancient Town of Tye (1969)
 Edwardian Rye from Contemporary Photographs (1974)
 The Story of the Ypres Tower and the Rye Museum (1975)
 A Connoisseurs Guide to Rye (1979)
 The Book of Rye: an Ancient Town of the Cinque Ports Confederation (1982)
 A Picture Guide to Romney Marsh and Adjoining Levels (1986)

Notes

1901 births
1992 deaths
20th-century English painters
English male painters
20th-century Canadian painters
Canadian male painters
Artists from Montreal
Canadian war artists
Canadian military personnel of World War II
British war artists
20th-century English male artists
20th-century Canadian male artists